Eduard Kunz, (born October 30, 1980 in Omsk, Soviet Union) is a Russian pianist. He reached the 2nd round in the International Tchaikovsky Competition in 2011.

Biography 
Eduard was born in Siberia from an assimilated minority German ethnic in Russia. He studied with  Michail Khokhlov at the Gnessin Special school for gifted children and with Andrei Diev at the Moscow Tchaikovsky Conservatory. He made his debut with the Omsk Philharmonic Orchestra at the age of 10.
He gained a Postgraduate Diploma with Distinction as well as the Gold Medal for performance from the Royal Northern College of Music studying with Norma Fisher and the late Mark Ray.

Named among 10 tomorrow's great pianists by the BBC Music Magazine, Eduard Kunz has performed and broadcast with many major orchestras in the UK including the BBC Symphony, BBC Concert, and BBC Scottish Symphony orchestras, the Royal Scottish National Orchestra, Hallé, Ulster Orchestra, City of Birmingham Symphony Orchestra, Welsh National Opera Orchestra, Royal Liverpool Philharmonic and London Musici orchestras, with conductors such as Tugan Sokhiev, Christian Mandeal, Edward Gardner, Gerard Schwarz, Lothar Koenigs, Garry Walker, Clark Rundell, Mark Stephenson, Alejandro Posada, Josep Caballe Domenech, Alexander Joel, Andrés Orozco-Estrada, Barry Wordsworth and David Angus, amongst others.

Other important debuts included Deutsches Symphonie-Orchester Berlin at the Berlin Philharmonie, The Philharmonia Orchestra at the Royal Albert Hall, Royal Stockholm Philharmonic Orchestra, Orquesta Sinfónica de Castilla y León, Orkest van het Oosten, Orchestre national du Capitole de Toulouse and Braunschweig Symphony orchestras as well as recitals at the Wigmore Hall in London, Bridgewater Hall in Manchester, Louvre in Paris, Concertgebouw in Amsterdam and Winterthur Hall in Barcelona, amongst many others.
Recordings for classical radio stations include BBC Radio 3, Radio France and Deutschlandradio Kultur amongst many others.

Eduard is a winner of thirteen first prizes of international piano competitions including First Prize of George Enescu Competition in Bucharest and Gold Medals of the New Orleans and Paderewski International Piano Competitions.

Other awards included Silver medal from The Worshipful Company of Musicians in London, awards from Hattori and Musical Foundation, Dame Myra Hess and Yamaha Music Foundation of Europe as well as Spivakov Foundation and “Richter” award from Rostropovich Foundation in Moscow. In the 2011, he reached the 2nd round in the International Tchaikovsky Competition.

Eduard's stage partners include Yulian Rachlin, Patricia Kopachinskaya, Sol Gabetta, Vilde Frang, Boris Andrianov, Aleksandr Ghindin and Yuriy Medyanik.
Eduard's performances were recorded by all major European stations including BBC Radio 3, Radio France and Deutsche Radio Kultur and Russian Orpheus. 
Eduard radio recordings include Piano Concerto No. 10 (Mozart)  with BBC Scottish Orchestra, Piano Concerto No. 3 (Beethoven) and Piano Concerto No. 1(Tchaikovsky) with Ulster Orchestra Northern Ireland, Piano Concerto No. 2 (Rachmaninoff) with BBC Concert Orchestra, Schumann and Dmitri Shostakovich concertos with WNO and the Rhapsody on a Theme of Paganini by Sergei Rachmaninoff with BBC Symphony Orchestra, as well as a recording  with Alexandru Tomescu of complete repertoire for violin and piano by George Enescu.

Eduard is the co-founder of Kunz Piano Academy in Brașov, Romania, where he invites young artists from all around the world twice a year for a week of public masterclasses. In 2020, the Academy will have its 4th edition.

Eduard is a Moscow Philharmonic Society Artist, Verbier Festival laureate, a former BBC Radio 3 New Generation Artist (2006–2008) and a Yamaha Artist.

He is featured in the 2010 film A Surprise in Texas about the 2009 Van Cliburn Foundation competition.

Awards and Competitions

References

External links
 Official web-site
 Youtube channel
 Rachmaninov - Moments musicaux, Op. 16: No. 2, 3, 4
 Scarlatti - Piano Sonata in D minor, K.213
 
 
 

Russian classical pianists
Male classical pianists
Russian people of German descent
1980 births
Gnessin State Musical College alumni
Living people
Alumni of the Royal Northern College of Music
BBC Radio 3 New Generation Artists
21st-century classical pianists
21st-century Russian male musicians